Prenal Oberoi Singh is an Indian actress who primarily works in Hindi serials. Prenal is best known and popular for the role of Empress Charumitra in Colors TV's serial Chakravartin Ashoka Samrat. Oberai also worked in a Gujarati film. She is also known for the movie Mumbai Meri Jaan by R. Madhavan. She has worked in Colors TV's Na Bole Tum Na Maine Kuch Kaha, Pyaar Ka Dard Hai Meetha Meetha Pyaara Pyaara.

Personal life
Completed her Schooling from Sir C.J High School Tardeo.Prinal married co-actor Pankaj Bhuveneshvar Singh in Feb 2014 in Varanasi. They had a year long courtship.

Filmography

Films

Television

References

External links
 
 

Indian film actresses
Indian television actresses
Living people
Punjabi people
Punjabi women
Year of birth missing (living people)